The Mall is a cricket ground in Armagh, Northern Ireland.  In 2005, the ground hosted a List A match in the 2005 ICC Trophy between Denmark and the United States, which Denmark won by 96 runs.

The ground is used in club matches by Armagh Cricket Club.

References

External links
The Mall, Armagh at CricketArchive

Cricket grounds in Northern Ireland
Buildings and structures in Armagh (city)
Sports venues in County Armagh